Khalid bin Mohsen Shaari (born 28 February 1991) is a Saudi Arabian man, who in August 2013 was found to be the heaviest living person, and the second-heaviest person in recorded history at , behind Jon Brower Minnoch. As a result of medical treatment, he lost a total of —more than half his body weight—in six months.

Biography
Khalid bin Mohsen Shaari was born in Saudi Arabia on 28 February 1991. He was 22 when he was declared the "fattest man alive", with a BMI of 204.

In 2013, Saudi King Abdullah ordered him to come from his home in Jizan to King Fahd Medical City in the country's capital, Riyadh, to undergo a series of dietary and physical programs to help him lose weight. During the weight loss, he was able to walk for the first time in five years, in February 2016, with a walker. By November 2017, he had lost  and now weighs . In January 2018, he had his last surgeries to remove excess skin.

References

1991 births
Living people
21st-century Saudi Arabian people
Obesity